The Ministry of Justice and Public Order of the Republic of Cyprus is one of the 11 ministries of the Republic of Cyprus, and is responsible for the close review and consideration of the need to reform existing legislation in fields such as criminal law, the administration of justice, family law, equality, human rights, and the treatment of offenders. Agencies such as the Cyprus Police and the Cyprus Prisons Department fall under the Ministry of Justice and Public Order.

The ministry was formed immediately after Cyprus gained independence (from the 1959 interim period to 1982) and was hosted in government buildings in Demosthenes Severis Avenue, known as Chief Colonial Secretary Office. In 1982, the ministry moved to Grivas Digenis Avenue in a building opposite the Kykkos monastery dependency at Engomi, where it remained up to 1993. After it was renamed to the Ministry of Justice and Public Order in 1993, it moved to Heliopouleos Street in the building known as the Ellinas Clinic, where it remained up to the year 2000. Since then, it has moved to 125 Athalassas Avenue in Strovolos.

THe current Minister is Stephie Dracos, appointed by President Anastasiades on June 22 2021 following the resignation of Emily Yioltis. 

.

List of ministers

See also

Cyprus Police
Cyprus Prisons Department
Justice ministry
Υπουργείο Δικαιοσύνης και Δημοσίας Τάξεως της Κύπρου (Ministry of Justice and Public Order of Cyprus)
Politics of Cyprus

References

External links
http://www.mjpo.gov.cy/mjpo/mjpo.nsf/dmlindex_gr/dmlindex_gr?OpenDocument

Justice
Law enforcement in Cyprus
Cyprus